"Levels" is a song by American rapper Meek Mill, released on July 2, 2013 as the lead single from the Maybach Music Group compilation album, Self Made Vol. 3. The song has since peaked at number 15 on the US Billboard Bubbling Under Hot 100 Singles chart.

Reception
Rob Markman from MTV noted the song's personal content, describing it as what "is focused on upward mobility," and claimed that "Meek thumbs his nose at lower-tier rappers."

Music video
The music video premiered on August 13, 2013, on WorldStarHipHop and was directed by Hype Williams. Fellow American rappers T.I., Rick Ross and Big Sean appear in the video, along with DJ Drama.

Track listing
 Digital single

Charts

Weekly charts

Certifications

Release history

References

2013 singles
2013 songs
Meek Mill songs
Maybach Music Group singles
Music videos directed by Hype Williams
Atlantic Records singles
Song recordings produced by Cardo (record producer)
Songs written by Meek Mill
Songs written by Lamont Dozier
Songs written by Cardo (record producer)